Michael A. Mulyar (born 1978), is an American chess International Master from Westminster, Colorado, and attended Yale University. Mulyar is a three-time Colorado State Champion (1992, 1993, 1995), and he has represented the U.S. in international competition. He won the U.S. Open Chess Championship in 1999 and 2007.

References

External links

1978 births
Living people
People from Westminster, Colorado
American chess players
Chess International Masters